Barbara Minto is an American author and consultant focused on the subject of executive communication.

Biography 
Minto's career began as a secretary at an American railway company in the 1950s "making 400 bucks a month". Concerned that her supervisor's age and ill-health would result in the loss of her well-paying position, she applied to Harvard Business School, which at the time did not require an undergraduate degree, and was admitted upon passing the entry exam.

Minto graduated from Harvard Business School in 1963. She was one of only eight women to graduate in a class of 600. Minto was the first female MBA hired by McKinsey & Company, starting with the firm in Cleveland, Ohio in 1963, and moving to London in 1966, where she served until 1973.

After layoffs at McKinsey arising from the 1973 Oil Crisis, Minto began her own training business focused on the executive communication techniques she pioneered during her tenure.

Minto published her book, The Pyramid Principle: Logic in Writing and Thinking, in 1985, and an upgraded edition entitled The Minto Pyramid Principle: Logic in Writing, Thinking and Problem Solving in 1996.

She continues to conduct training sessions for small groups of participants globally, through her business Minto Books International, Inc.

Work 
Minto is the originator of the MECE principle pronounced "ME-see", a grouping principle for separating a set of items into subsets that are mutually exclusive (ME) and collectively exhaustive (CE).

MECE underlies her Minto Pyramid Principle, which suggests that people's ideas should be communicated in a pyramid format in which summary points are derived from constituent and supporting sub-points:

 Grouping together low-level facts they see as similar
 Drawing an insight from having seen the similarity
 Forming a new grouping of related insights, etc.

Minto argues that one "can’t derive an idea from a grouping unless the ideas in the grouping are logically the same, and in logical order.”

Publications 
Books

 1985: The Pyramid Principle: Logic in Writing and Thinking
 1996: The Minto Pyramid Principle: Logic in Writing, Thinking and Problem Solving

References

External links 

 Barbara Minto on LinkedIn
 
 

American consultants
20th-century American writers
20th-century American women writers
American business executives
American women business executives
Harvard Business School alumni
Year of birth missing (living people)
Living people
21st-century American women